The Brush-Off is a 1996 Australian, Ned Kelly Awards-winning crime thriller, written by Shane Maloney. It is the second novel in a series of crime thrillers following the character of Murray Whelan, as he investigates crimes in the Melbourne area in the course of trying to keep his job with the Australian Labor Party.

Movie

In 2004, The Brush-Off was adapted into a television movie by Huntaway Films and the Seven Network as part of The Murray Whelan Series. The screenplay was written by John Clarke and directed by Sam Neill.  David Wenham was cast as Murray Whelan (reprising his role from the previous film Stiff), with a supporting cast that included Mick Molloy, Deborah Kennedy and Steve Bisley.

Awards

Ned Kelly Awards for Crime Writing, Best Australian Crime Novel Award, 1997: winner

Notes

This novel has been translated into German (2000), Japanese (2002) and French (2004).

References

External links
 The Brush-Off Listing for The Brush-Off on Shane Maloney's official website.

1996 Australian novels
Australian crime novels
Novels set in Melbourne
Australian novels adapted into films
Ned Kelly Award-winning works
Text Publishing books